Pocota stackelbergi is a species of Asian hoverfly.

Distribution
Russia.

References

Diptera of Asia
Eristalinae
Insects described in 1957